Miriam Gamble (born 1980) is a poet who won the Eric Gregory Award in 2007 and the Somerset Maugham Award in 2011. She lives in Scotland and works as a lecturer at the University of Edinburgh.

Life and career

Miriam Gamble was born in Brussels, Belgium, in 1980 and grew up in Belfast in Northern Ireland. She studied English Language and Literature at the University of Oxford and Modern Literary Studies at Queen's University of Belfast where she also received her phD in Form, Genre and Lyric Subjectivity in Contemporary British and Irish Poetry. She moved to Scotland in 2010 and began teaching creative writing at the University of Edinburgh in 2012.

Her first collection of poems called, The Squirrels Are Dead was published in 2010 by Bloodaxe Books. Gamble's second collection, Pirate Music, was also published by Bloodaxe Books. Her third, What Planet, was published by Bloodaxe in May 2019 and received the 2020 Pigott Poetry Prize.

Awards and nominations

2007 - Eric Gregory Award
2010 - Ireland Chair of Poetry Bursary Award
2011 - Somerset Maugham Award for The Squirrels Are Dead
2012 - Vincent Buckley Poetry Prize
2020 - Pigott Poetry Prize

References

1980 births
Living people
Academics of the University of Edinburgh
Writers from Belfast
Alumni of the University of Oxford
Alumni of Queen's University Belfast